Woodhill is a locality in the City of Shoalhaven in New South Wales, Australia. It lies in the hills about 10 km northwest of Berry. It is home to the Rodway Nature Reserve, a 83ha park created in May 1970 and managed by the NSW National Parks and Wildlife Service.

Demographics
was female. The median age of residents was 62.

References

City of Shoalhaven
Localities in New South Wales